In mathematical physics and probability and statistics, the Gaussian q-distribution is a family of probability distributions that includes, as limiting cases, the uniform distribution and the normal (Gaussian) distribution. It was introduced by Diaz and Teruel. It is a q-analog of the Gaussian or normal distribution.

The distribution is symmetric about zero and is bounded, except for the limiting case of the normal distribution. The limiting uniform distribution is on the range -1 to +1.

Definition

Let q be a real number in the interval [0, 1). The probability density function of the  Gaussian q-distribution is given by

where

 

The q-analogue [t]q of the real number  is given by

 

The q-analogue of the exponential function is the q-exponential, E, which is given by

 

where the q-analogue of the factorial is the q-factorial, [n]q!, which is in turn given by

 

for an integer n > 2 and [1]q! = [0]q! = 1.

The cumulative distribution function of the Gaussian q-distribution is given by

 

where the integration symbol denotes the Jackson integral.

The function Gq is given explicitly by

 

where

Moments
The moments of the Gaussian q-distribution are given by

 

 

where the symbol [2n − 1]!! is the q-analogue of the double factorial given by

See also
Q-Gaussian process

References

Exton, H. (1983), q-Hypergeometric Functions and Applications, New York: Halstead Press, Chichester: Ellis Horwood, 1983, 

Continuous distributions
Q-analogs